Poul Nielsen was a footballer who represented the Denmark national football team as a striker between 1910 and 1925. He scored his first international goal on 2 July 1912 in a 4–1 win over the Netherlands at the 1912 Summer Olympics semi-finals. Since then, he has become his country's all-time top scorer in international football, with 52 goals in just 38 appearances.

On 5 October 1913, Nielsen scored his first international hat-trick against Sweden during a friendly match, netting 6 goals in a 10–0 win. He has scored a national record of eight international hat-tricks (5 of which against Norway), and besides his 6-goal haul against Sweden, he has also netted five international goals in just over 10 minutes in a match against Norway on 7 October 1917.

International goals
Scores and results list Denmark's goal tally first and score column indicates the score after each Nielsen goal.

Hat-tricks

Statistics

See also 
 List of men's footballers with 50 or more international goals

References 

Denmark national football team
Nielsen, Poul